Wellington Dam Hydro Power Station is a hydroelectric power station near Collie, Western Australia. The Wellington Dam Hydro Power Station was one of three hydro power stations in Western Australia, with only the Ord River hydro still in operation. The dam was constructed in 1933 and enlarged in 1956, and the power station was built from 1954 to 1956 and commissioned on 3 July 1956. It was placed into care and maintenance in 2007.

Wellington Dam is the largest dam in the South West and the second largest in Western Australia, and is fed by the Collie River.

In December 2009 the Water Corporation started a $41 million project to strengthen the dam wall.

History

Wellington Dam was built in the early 1900s to supply water to the Great Southern Towns Water Supply systemthe pipeline system that supplies water to the wheatbelt towns in Southern WA. Supplying towns as far north as Northam, east to Lake Grace, south to Katanning. The line basically runs parallel to the Goldfields water supply scheme (from Mundaring Weir to Kalgoorlie), and the two lines even join somewhere.
It gets its water from the Collie River catchment, which started going salty during the 1960s and 1970s. Much re-afforestation work has been happening since the 1980s to slow down the trend of rising salinity. A new dam on nearby Harris River was commissioned in the 1990s to supply fresh water until such time as Wellington Dam is fresh again sometime in the future.

Mural

In 2021, an 8000 square metre mural was painted on the dam wall. The mural, titled "Reflections", was done by artist Guido van Helten. It is the largest mural painted on a dam in the world.

Gallery

References

External links 

Verve Energy page on hydrolectricity

Dams completed in 1933
Energy infrastructure completed in 1956
Hydroelectric power stations in Western Australia
Shire of Collie
State Register of Heritage Places in the Shire of Collie
Dams in Western Australia